Dave LaMont is an American sports commentator, working as a play-by-play man for ESPN since 2004.

Early career

LaMont served as a radio announcer for Miami Hurricanes basketball and baseball from 1998 until 2000, as well as serving as a host and substitute play-by-play announcer for the Miami Heat from 1993 to 1999.

LaMont was previously the voice of the Florida Atlantic Owls football program, from its inception in 2001 through the 2010 season. In 2010, LaMont made headlines for an angry rant about an apparent head-to-head hit during an FAU radio broadcast.

He spent six years as the co-host of NFL Sunday on Westwood One Radio, from 2002 until 2008, and was the spring training PA voice for the Baltimore Orioles during their last eight years in Fort Lauderdale from 2001 until 2009.

ESPN and Fox Sports
LaMont began working part-time for ABC Sports as a college football sideline reporter in 2004, adding play-by-play duties in 2005. He continued serving as a part-time college football play-by-play man for ESPN and ABC from 2006 until 2010.

In 2011, LaMont joined ESPN full-time, doing play-by-play for college football on ESPN, college basketball on the SEC Network and several other assignments as well.

In 2016, LaMont became the lead play-by-play broadcaster for PBA Tour events on ESPN. In 2019, LaMont filled in on a PBA broadcast on FOX Sports, when current lead broadcaster Rob Stone was not available.

In 2020, LaMont faced internal criticism at ESPN for comments he made during an ESPN college football broadcast team conference call about race following the George Floyd protests. Although not calling college football during 2020 for ESPN, LaMont called 2020 USL Championship soccer on ESPN+ in August.

References

Year of birth missing (living people)
Living people
University of Miami alumni
National Basketball Association broadcasters
American radio sports announcers
American television sports announcers
College basketball announcers in the United States
College football announcers
Miami Heat announcers
People from Plantation, Florida
Bowling broadcasters